HRnetGroup is a recruitment and consulting company based in Singapore. The company operates in the areas of flexible staffing as well as professional recruitment in various industries including  finance, manufacturing, retail, and technology, among others. HRnetGroup is listed on the Mainboard of the Singapore Exchange under the stock code “CHZ”.

History 
HRnetGroup was founded in 1992 by Peter Sim, a former human resources director at Thomson Consumer Electronics and Honeywell. The company began with four employees and  the first overseas office was opened in Kuala Lumpur in 1994.
 
As of 30 June 2022, the company had 883 employees and offices in China, Hong Kong, Indonesia, Japan, Malaysia, South Korea and Thailand.
 
In 2016, Heliconia Capital, a unit of Singapore investment firm Temasek Holdings, invested in HRnetGroup. In June 2017, HRnetGroup raised S$174m through an IPO on the Singapore Exchange, selling stocks for S$0.90 per share. from institutional and other investors including Affin Hwang Asset Management Berhad, Credit Suisse, and Fidelity International. In 2019, the company founded RecruitFirst in Taiwan. In 2020, RecruitFirst were established in Jakarta and HRnetOne were set up in Shenzhen.  In 2021, REForce expanded into Chengdu.

Investments and acquisitions 
HRnetGroup holds a 14.47% share of voting rights for UK-based recruitment and training organisation Staffline Group. HRnetGroup acquired a 51% stake in REForce (Shanghai) Human Resources Management Consulting in 2018. 
 
In 2018, the company invested US$378k in the recruitment website Glints. The company acquired 51% stake in REForce (Shanghai) Human Resources Management Consulting in 2018.

Operations and subsidiaries
HRnetGroup operates through its headquarters in Singapore and satellite offices in the following countries: Singapore, China, Hong Kong, Taiwan, Thailand, Malaysia, Japan, South Korea and Indonesia. As of 2021, the company has opened 11 subsidiaries in Asia including HRnetOne (1992), Recruit Express (1996), People Search (2000), People First (2005), Recruit Legal (2005), SearchAsia Consulting (2005), Recruit First (2013), YesPay (2016), HRnetRimbun (2018), REForce (2018) and Center Point Personnel (2018). Some of the subsidiaries act as specializing agencies that recruit professionals for specific industries. For instance, its subsidiaries HRnet One, PeopleSearch, PeopleFirst and SearchAsia work with professional industries while Recruit Express and RecruitFirst recruit flexible workers.

Notable subsidiaries
HRnetOne - established in 1992 with the first office in Singapore, it is the oldest and largest subsidiary in the HRnetGroup. In addition to the headquarters in Singapore, it operates offices in Kuala Lumpur, Malaysia, Beijing, Shenzhen, Hong Kong, Taipei, Tokyo, Bangkok and Seoul. Its main areas of recruitment include Healthcare and Life Science, Retail and Sourcing, Consumer, Industrial & Chemical, Food Science, Automotive, Real Estate and Construction, Technology and Communications, along with functional practices in HR, Finance & Accounting, and Legal & Compliance.
People Search/People First  - specializes in Banking and finance, consumer, industrial and chemical, hospitality, IT, corporate functions, electronics and semiconductors, healthcare and life sciences.
Recruit First - temporary staffing, contract staffing, executive search, payroll services, management consultancy
REForce (Shanghai) - specializes in consulting services.

References 

Employment agencies of Singapore
Human resource management consulting firms
Companies listed on the Singapore Exchange
Singaporean companies established in 1992
Employment agencies of Hong Kong
Employment agencies of China